Club Deportivo Torrevieja was a Spanish football team based in Torrevieja, in the autonomous community of Valencia. Founded in 1993 and dissolved in 2020, they played 14 seasons in Tercera División, and held home games at Estadio Vicente García, with a capacity of 6,000 seats.

History
In Torrevieja, football started to become popular during the time of the World War I. The first official ground was inaugurated in 1920, near the town's bus station, with a statue of a footballer being erected in the small plaza behind it in later years.

The first reference to Torrevieja CF is in 1923 and, although there was no official league for the team to play in, friendlies and summer cup competitions were arranged against other teams in the Vega Baja del Segura region. During the Spanish Civil War football came to a standstill, and it was not until the mid-1950s that Torrevieja again had an official team, with both Español Frente de Juventudes (known as el Hueso) and Club Deportivo Torrevejense (known as el Remiendo) being formed, with the peculiarity that no admission was charged, with fans making whatever contribution they could.

Over the next 15 years, both of the clubs folded, leaving a void which was filled in 1971 with the foundation of Torrevieja Club de Fútbol. The town's mayor, Vicente García García, and his administration, took on the task of building the football ground, which was named after the politician, being inaugurated with a match with neighbouring Hércules CF.

In 1978, Torrevieja reached the fourth division–the first national category–for the first time, competing in that level for ten years after which it promoted again, now to the third level, a spell that ended in the 1992–93 campaign, with the club suffering another relegation in 1994 due to financial irregularities.

A new football club was set up in the town in 1993, Club Deportivo Torrevieja, which started playing in the second regional league. By 1996, the new side promoted to the competition's top level, as the original club dropped to the second, and was also renamed Fútbol Club Torrevieja, promoting to division four in 1997, but being relegated two seasons after.

In the 2002–03 season, Restituto Marroquí was elected as club president by the local council (Torrevieja was a municipal club owned by the city council). The new manager was Croatian Vlado Macan, which achieved a mid-table finish with a squad made up of young local players. In January 2003, at a meeting in the “Total Football Bar” owned by founder member Rob Palmer in the Urbanización San Luis, a group of mainly British fans met and agreed to set up a supporters' club. This group had been following the team all season (both home and away matches), and had helped to increase crowds at the ground from 100 or so to 5000. The name chosen was “The Torry Army”, and the first president was Eduardo "Eddie" Cagigao.

In 2005, new manager Riquelme (formerly of Novelda CF and Jumilla CF), in charge since the previous year, led Torrevieja to a third division return. Subsequently, the team turned professional for the first time, but the manager was sacked before Christmas, after a 0–1 home loss against CD Castellón B; the side eventually finished in mid-table.
 
In two of the following four seasons, Torrevieja managed to appear twice in the third division promotion playoffs, falling in 2007 against UD Fuerteventura (after disposing of Utebo FC) and in 2009 against Haro Deportivo (1–2 on aggregate).

Following approval by the socios, starting in the 2014–15 season, the club reverts to its original name–Club Deportivo Torrevieja. On 29 September 2020, the club announced that would not play in any competition,

Season to season

14 seasons in Tercera División

Famous players
 Rubén Belima
 Alex Ricard

References

External links
Official website 
Futbolme team profile 
Official international website

Defunct football clubs in the Valencian Community
Association football clubs established in 1993
Association football clubs disestablished in 2020
1993 establishments in Spain
2020 disestablishments in Spain